This is an incomplete list of surfing events and competitions:

References

External links

Surfing
 
Surfing